A lecher is a person with very strong, perhaps excessive, sexual desires. See also Lechery.

Lecher may also refer to:

People
 Dr. Berek Lajcher (also spelled Lecher, 1893–1943), Jewish physician and Holocaust resistance leader
 Ernst Lecher (1856–1926), Austrian physicist
 Ernst Bacon (Ernst Lecher Bacon, 1898–1990), American composer
 Otto Lecher (1861–1939), Austrian politician

Science
Lecher line, a device for measuring radio wavelengths